Dominique Prosper de Chermont was Governor General of Inde française during the Second French Colonial Empire.

Titles

History of Puducherry
French colonial governors and administrators
Governors of French India
1741 births
1798 deaths
People from Toul
Governors of Isle de France (Mauritius)